William de St Croix (13 May 1819 at Windsor Castle, Berkshire – 18 March 1877 at Glynde, Sussex) was an English amateur cricketer and clergyman. He played first-class cricket from 1839 to 1842 for Cambridge University Cricket Club and Cambridge Town Club, making 15 known appearances in first-class matches.

William de St Croix was educated at Eton and St John's College, Cambridge, graduating in 1843. He was then ordained and became the Vicar of Glynde from 1844 until his death in 1877. He was the author of several sermons and archaeological papers.

References

External links

Bibliography
 Arthur Haygarth, Scores & Biographies, Volumes 2–3 (1827–1848), Lillywhite, 1862

1819 births
1877 deaths
English cricketers
English cricketers of 1826 to 1863
Cambridge University cricketers
Cambridge Town Club cricketers
People educated at Eton College
Alumni of St John's College, Cambridge
Gentlemen of England cricketers
People from Glynde